The 1996 Comcast U.S. Indoor was a men's tennis tournament played on indoor carpet courts at the CoreStates Spectrum in Philadelphia, Pennsylvania in the United States and was part of the Championship Series of the 1996 ATP Tour. It was the 29th edition of the tournament and ran from February 26 through March 3, 1996. Second-seeded Jim Courier won the singles title.

Finals

Singles

 Jim Courier defeated  Chris Woodruff 6–4, 6–3
 It was Courier's only singles title of the year and the 19th of his career.

Doubles

 Todd Woodbridge /  Mark Woodforde defeated  Byron Black /  Grant Connell 7–6, 6–2
 It was Woodbridge's 2nd title of the year and the 42nd of his career. It was Woodforde's 3rd title of the year and the 46th of his career.

References

External links
 ITF tournament edition details

Comcast U.S. Indoor
U.S. Pro Indoor
Comcast U.S.
Comcast U.S.
Comcast U.S.
Comcast U.S.